Santo André, São Paulo is a Brazilian municipality.

Santo André (Portuguese and Galician for Saint Andrew) may also refer to:

Places
Brazil:
Santo André, Paraíba, a city

Cape Verde:
Santo André (Porto Novo), a civil parish

Portugal:
Santo André (Santiago do Cacém), a city
Santo André, Póvoa de Varzim, a neighborhood
Cape Santo André

Spain:
Santo André de Teixido, a pilgrimage sanctuary in Cedeira, Galicia

Other
Esporte Clube Santo André, a Brazilian football (soccer) team
NRP Santo André, a Portuguese Navy ship 1962–1975, now the museum ship Rickmer Rickmers in Hamburg
Navio Museu Santo André, a museum ship in Gafanha da Nazaré, Ílhavo, Portugal